The 10 kilometres race walk, or 10-kilometer racewalk, is a racewalking event.  The event is competed as a road race. Athletes must always keep in contact with the ground and the supporting leg must remain straight until the raised leg passes it.  10 kilometers is 6.21 miles.

History

It was introduced at the 1912 Summer Olympics in Stockholm for men, and the 1992 Summer Olympics in Barcelona for women.  It is no longer an  Olympic event, having been changed to 20 km after 1952 for men and in 1999 for women, though it is still run in some international competitions.

World records
On May 28, 2000, Roman Rasskazov of Russia set a new 10-km race walk world record in Saransk in a time of 37:11. The all-time women's 10-km race-walk record is held by Yelena Nikolayeva of Russia, at 41:04.

All-time top 25

Men
Correct as of 2 September 2018.

Notes
Below is a list of other times equal or superior to 38:30:

Francisco Javier Fernández also walked 38:01.4 (2001), 38:12 (2006), 38:25 (2007), 38:28 (2008).
Robert Korzeniowski also walked 38:03.2 (2001).
Ilya Markov also walked 38:25 (2007), 38:30 (2006).

Women
Correct as of October 2020.

Notes

Below is a list of other times equal or superior to 42:01:
Olimpiada Ivanova also walked 41:30 (1995), 41:46 (1996) and 41:59 (1997).
Yelena Nikolayeva also walked 41:41 (1997) and 41:49 (1996).
Kjersti Plätzer also walked 41:41 (2009), 41:54 (1999) and 41:56 (2002).
Kerry Saxby-Junna also walked 41:47 (1996).
Larisa Khmelnitskaya also walked 41:49 (1996) and 41:56 (1997).
Irina Stankina also walked 41:52 (1997), 41:55 (1995) and 42:01 (1996).
Yelena Gruzinova also walked 41:58 (1995).

Medalists

Men's Olympic medalists

Women's Olympic medalists

Women's World Championships medalists

Season's bests

Men

Women

External links
IAAF list of 10-kilometres-race-walk records in XML

References

Racewalking distances